James McCoy may refer to:
 James McCoy (politician) (1821–1895), California politician
 James B. McCoy (1839–1911), Wisconsin politician
 James M. McCoy (1930–2022), sixth Chief Master Sergeant of the Air Force
 James Russell McCoy (1845–1924), Magistrate of the British Overseas Territory of Pitcairn Island

See also
 Jim McCoy (1875–1913), Australian footballer